Manon Aubry (born 22 December 1989)  is a French politician representing la France Insoumise. A former Oxfam France spokeswoman, she won a seat in the 2019 European Parliament election and is co-chair of The Left in the European Parliament (GUE/NGL) parliamentary grouping with Martin Schirdewan since 2019.

Biography 

Aubry was born in Fréjus and studied at Saint-Exupéry High School in  Saint-Raphaël in the département of Var. She is the daughter of Catherine Poggi-Aubry and Bruno Aubry, journalist, writer and teacher; she is unrelated to the Mayor of Lille, Martine Aubry. In 2005, she campaigned for the "no" in the referendum on the European Constitutional Treaty, and opposed the François Fillon reform of education during the same time. In 2006 she joined the movement against the "first job contract" (Contrat première embauche, similar to a UK zero-hour contract) and she organized the protest and blocked her high school.

She has a degree in international affairs and human rights from the faculty of "Sciences Po Paris" and was a student at the Columbia University. At Sciences Po, she presides in 2009 the local section of the National Union of Students of France (UNEF). She joined the humanitarian sector at "Doctors of the World" in Liberia. She has lived for nearly two years in the Democratic Republic of Congo, where she worked for an NGO about the violation of human rights.

In 2014, Manon Aubry became a member of the Oxfam France association where she was responsible of advocating "tax justice and inequalities" until December 2018. She wrote several reports on tax evasion, inequalities and the sharing of wealth in large companies: "I tracked down the most fortunate who do not pay their fair share of tax and who make tax evasion... hounded large multinationals who prefer to pay a few zealous shareholders rather than the vast majority of wage earners who produce wealth." She taught at Sciences Po Paris faculty about human rights.

Having practiced swimming competitively, she now plays water polo.

Political career 
In December 2018, Manon Aubry was appointed by the electoral committee of the left-wing La France Insoumise party (FI) as leading the list of the movement in the 2019 European Parliament election. On this occasion, she joined the party and also led the campaign, doing several political meetings across France. On 26 May 2019, she was elected along with five other La France insoumise candidates. Following the constitutive session of the ninth European Parliament, she became the new co-chair of the European United Left–Nordic Green Left parliamentary grouping together with the German MEP Martin Schirdewan, succeeding Gabi Zimmer.

References 

1989 births
Living people
French people of Corsican descent
La France Insoumise politicians
21st-century French women politicians
People from Fréjus
Politicians from Provence-Alpes-Côte d'Azur
MEPs for France 2019–2024
21st-century French politicians